Erpa is a river of North Rhine-Westphalia, Germany.

The Erpa springs near , a district of Zülpich. It is a left tributary of the Lechenicher Mühlengraben North of Ahrem, a district of Erftstadt. The Lechenicher Mühlengraben is a confluence of the Rotbach.

See also
List of rivers of North Rhine-Westphalia

References

Rivers of North Rhine-Westphalia
Rivers of Germany